The Secretariat of the 10th Congress of the Russian Communist Party (Bolsheviks) was in session from 16 March 1921 to 3 April 1922.

Composition

References

Secretariat of the Central Committee of the Communist Party of the Soviet Union members
Politburo
Politburo
Politburo